Nectandra dasystyla is a species of plant in the family Lauraceae.

It is found in moist lowland forests of Bolivia, Peru, and possibly Ecuador.

References

dasystyla
Trees of South America
Vulnerable flora of South America
Taxonomy articles created by Polbot
Trees of Bolivia
Trees of Peru